Norwegian county road 417 (Fv417) is a Norwegian county road in Agder county, Norway. The Sørlandsbanen railway line crosses this road twice.

References

417
Road transport in Agder
Vegårshei
Gjerstad